KWRA-LP (96.7 FM) is a radio station broadcasting a religious radio format. Licensed to Waco, Texas, United States. The station is currently owned by Amistad Baptist Church.

References

External links
 
 

WRA-LP
WRA-LP
WRA-LP
Baptist Christianity in Texas